Cretin Hall is one of the male undergraduate residence halls at the University of St. Thomas in Saint Paul, Minnesota. It resides on the South Campus, which is just south of historic Summit Avenue.  Cretin was originally constructed as the South Student Residence Building for the Saint Paul Seminary in 1894. It was designed by architect Cass Gilbert, who also designed Cretin's two sister buildings, Loras Hall and Grace Hall. In 1987 Cretin was acquired by St. Thomas and in 1989 it was renovated for use as a residence hall.

Cretin Hall is named after the first Roman Catholic Bishop of St. Paul, Joseph Crétin. Initial funding came from a $500,000 donation by Great Northern Railway President James J. Hill. Hill’s donation paid for the construction of the Cretin Residence Hall and its twin, Loras Residence Hall. 

Cretin Residence Hall is a -story, hipped-roof building faced in red pressed brick and designed in what Gilbert called a “Northern Italian style.”

On January 17, 2023, St. Thomas announced plans for a new on-campus indoor arena. As part of the plans, Cretin Hall and two other buildings will be demolished to make way for the arena. The school announced that the 2023–2024 school year would be the final for students at Credit Hall, with demolition scheduled for the summer of 2024.

Specifications 
Cretin houses 90 students on 5 levels. Community bathrooms with private shower stalls are located on each floor. Common areas include a service desk, computer room, recreation area, kitchenette, laundry room and recreation and TV areas.

References

Buildings and structures in Saint Paul, Minnesota
University of St. Thomas (Minnesota)
University and college dormitories in the United States
1894 establishments in Minnesota
Buildings and structures completed in 1894
Cass Gilbert buildings